Javier Carrión (born 9 November 1990) is a Spanish rugby sevens player. He competed for the Spanish rugby sevens team at the 2016 Summer Olympics. He was part of the team that won the 2016 Men's Rugby Sevens Final Olympic Qualification Tournament in Monaco. Carrión was also part of their 2013 Rugby World Cup Sevens squad.

References

External links 
 
 

1990 births
Living people
Rugby sevens players at the 2016 Summer Olympics
Olympic rugby sevens players of Spain
Spain international rugby sevens players